Percy Thomson Watson (1894 – ?), was a Northern Ireland international lawn bowler.

Bowls career
He represented Ireland in four Commonwealth games. He won a silver medal in the fours at the 1934 British Empire Games in London.

Twenty years later he won a gold medal in the pairs at the 1954 British Empire and Commonwealth Games in Vancouver, with William Rosbotham.

He also competed at the 1958 and 1962 Commonwealth Games and won the 1933 and 1938 Irish National Bowls Championships singles.

In addition to his two National singles titles he also won two National pairs titles in 1926 and 1930 bowling for the Cavehill Bowls Club.

Personal life
He was a director of a linen manufacturers by trade and lived in Bedford Street, Belfast. He was married to Margaret who died in 1982.

References

1894 births
Date of death unknown
Bowls players at the 1934 British Empire Games
Bowls players at the 1954 British Empire and Commonwealth Games
Bowls players at the 1958 British Empire and Commonwealth Games
Bowls players at the 1962 British Empire and Commonwealth Games
Commonwealth Games medallists in lawn bowls
Commonwealth Games gold medallists for Northern Ireland
Commonwealth Games silver medallists for Northern Ireland
Male lawn bowls players from Northern Ireland
Medallists at the 1934 British Empire Games
Medallists at the 1954 British Empire and Commonwealth Games